Long March 5 (LM-5), or Changzheng 5 (CZ-5), and also by its nickname "Pang-Wu" (胖五, "Fat-Five"), is a Chinese heavy-lift launch vehicle developed by the China Academy of Launch Vehicle Technology (CALT). It is the first Chinese launch vehicle designed to use exclusively non-hypergolic liquid propellants.  It is the fifth iteration of the Long March rocket family.

There are currently two CZ-5 variants: CZ-5 and CZ-5B.

The Long March 5 roughly matches the capabilities of American NSSL heavy-lift launch vehicles such as the Delta IV Heavy. It is currently the most powerful member of the Long March rocket family and the world's fourth most powerful orbital launch vehicle currently in operation, trailing the Delta IV Heavy, Falcon Heavy, and the Space Launch System.

The first CZ-5 launched from Wenchang Space Launch Site on 3 November 2016 and placed its payload in a suboptimal but workable initial orbit. The second CZ-5 rocket, launched on 2 July 2017, failed due to an engine problem in the first stage.

After an interval of almost two and a half years, the Long March 5 vehicle's return to flight mission (third launch) successfully occurred on 27 December 2019 with the launch and placement of the experimental Shijian-20 communications satellite into geostationary transfer orbit, thereby paving the way for the successful launch of Tianwen 1 Mars mission, lunar Chang'e 5 sample-return mission, and the modular space station, all of which require the lifting capabilities of a heavy lift launch vehicle.

History

Proposal and development 
Since 2010, Long March launches (all versions) have made up 15–25% of the global launch totals. Growing domestic demand for launch services has also allowed China's state launch provider to maintain a healthy manifest. Additionally, China had been able to secure some international launch contracts by offering package deals that bundle launch vehicles with Chinese satellites, thereby circumventing the effects of U.S. embargo.

China's main objective for initiating the new CZ-5 program in 2007 was in anticipation of its future requirement for larger LEO and GTO payload capacities during the next 20–30 years period. Formal approval of the Long March 5 program occurred in 2007 following two decades of feasibility studies when funding was finally granted by the Chinese government. At the time, the new rocket was expected to be manufactured at a facility in Tianjin, a coastal city near Beijing, while launch was expected to occur at the new Wenchang Space Launch Site in the southernmost island province of Hainan.

In July 2012, a new  thrust LOX/kerosene engine to be used on the Long March 5 boosters was test-fired by China.

The first photos of a CZ-5, undergoing tests, were released in March 2015.

The first production CZ-5 was shipped from the port of Tianjin in North China to Wenchang Space Launch Site on Hainan Island on 20 September 2015 for launch rehearsals.

The maiden flight of the CZ-5 was initially scheduled for 2014, but this subsequently slipped to 2016.

The final production and testing of the first CZ-5 rocket to be launched into orbit were completed at its Tianjin manufacturing facility on or about 16 August 2016 and the various segments of the rocket were shipped to the launch center on Hainan island shortly thereafter.

Early flights 
The launch was planned to take place at around 10:00 UTC on 3 November 2016, but several issues, involving an oxygen vent and chilling of the engines, were detected during the preparation, causing a delay of nearly three hours. The final countdown was interrupted three times due to problems with the flight control computer and the tracking software. The rocket finally launched at 12:43 UTC.

The second launch on 2 July 2017 experienced an anomaly shortly after launch and was switched to an alternate, gentler trajectory. However, it was declared a failure 45 minutes into the flight. Investigations revealed the source of the second flight's failure to be located in one of the core stage's YF-77 engines (specifically, in the oxidizer's turbo-pump).

The Y3 mission of the Long March 5 program was launched on 27 December 2019, at about 12:45 UTC from the Wenchang Space Launch Site in Hainan, China. CASC declared the mission a success within an hour of launch, after the Shijian-20 communications satellite was placed in geostationary transfer orbit, thus marking the Long March 5 program's return to flight.

Introduction of Long March 5B 
The fourth flight of the Long March 5 program also marked the debut of the CZ-5B variant. The CZ-5B variant is basically equivalent to the Long March 5 core stage with its four strapped-on liquid-fueled boosters; in place of the usual second stage of the base configuration, it is use to launch heavier low Earth orbit payloads, such as components of the Tiangong space station, would be carried by the 5B variant. The 5B variant may also be considered for launching constellation satellites in future with Yuanzheng upper stage.

The first flight of the 5B variant ("Y1 mission") carried an uncrewed prototype of China's future deep space crewed spacecraft, and, as a secondary payload, the Flexible Inflatable Cargo Re-entry Vehicle. The Y1 mission was launched on 5 May 2020, at 10:00 UTC from the Wenchang Space Launch Site in Hainan Island. CASC declared the launch a success after the payloads were placed in low Earth orbit.

The flight's secondary payload, the experimental cargo return craft, malfunctioned during its return to Earth on 6 May 2020. Nevertheless, the return capsule of the prototype next-generation crewed spacecraft, the flight's primary payload, successfully landed in north China's Inner Mongolia Autonomous Region at 05:49 UTC, on 8 May 2020. The prototype spacecraft flew in orbit for two days and 19 hours and carried out a series of successful experiments and technological verifications. The Y1 mission's core stage may have been the most massive object to make an uncontrolled re-entry since the Soviet Union's Salyut 7 space station in 1991 and the United States' Skylab in 1979, excluding the failed controlled reentry of Space Shuttle Columbia over populated areas of the Continental United States in 2003.

Space station construction
Long March 5B was the workhorse during the Tiangong space station construction. The second Long March 5B mission was the launch of Tianhe core module, the first component of the Chinese space station.

Design and specifications 
The chief designer of CZ-5 is Li Dong of the China Academy of Launch Vehicle Technology (CALT). The CZ-5 family includes three primary modular core stages of 5.2-m diameter (maximum). The vehicle's total length is 60.5 meters and its weight at launch is 643 tons, with a thrust of 833.8 tons. Boosters of various capabilities and diameters ranging from 2.25 meters to 3.35 meters would be assembled from three modular core stages and strap-on stages. The first stage and boosters would have a choice of engines that use different liquid rocket propellants: 1200 kN thrust LOX / kerosene engines or 1550 kN thrust LOX / LH2. The upper stage would use improved versions of the YF-75 engine.

Engine development began in 2000–2001, with testing directed by the China National Space Administration (CNSA) commencing in 2005. Versions of both new engines, the YF-100 and the YF-77, had been successfully tested by mid-2007.

The CZ-5 series can deliver ~23 tonnes of payload to LEO or ~14 tonnes of payload to GTO (geosynchronous transfer orbit). The CZ-5 launch vehicle would consist of a 5.0-m diameter core stage and four 3.35-m diameter strap-on boosters, which would be able to send a ~22 tonne payload to low Earth orbit (LEO).

Six CZ-5 variants were originally planned, but the light variants were cancelled in favor of CZ-6 and CZ-7 family launch vehicles.

Space debris concerns

The first stage of the Long March 5B variant, which can reach orbital velocity and weighs 21.6 tonnes, currently lacks the capability for controlled atmospheric re-entry, meaning that debris could cause damage on the ground upon re-entry. Without modification, it is expected all LEO launches of the Long March 5B will result in uncontrolled re-entries.

The 5B is the specific variant in concern due to its unique LEO configuration. The core rocket stage (first stage) is launched directly into orbit, which also unusually serves as the upper stage to perform payload insertion. Typically, the rocket's first stage never reaches orbital velocity, while the smaller upper stage will usually burn up in the atmosphere during re-entry. However, Long March 5B's first and upper stage is combined into one, making the mitigation effort more difficult.

Potential solutions include restarting engines during re-entry to reduce speed and collision probability, as the case for Long March 2D. China has also developed grid fins on other Long March variants to steer stages during re-entry. However, Long March 5B has yet to demonstrate these capabilities. Although the probability of rocket debris hitting populated areas is mathematically minuscule, the scientistic fears the lax attitude of many countries could eventually result in casualties. The debris found at Ivory Coast on May 2022 was reportedly the remains of the first Long March 5B launch (5B-Y1).

Responding to the criticism, CNSA claimed they had conducted measures to ensure safe re-entries. Xu Yansong, former director for international cooperation at the China National Space Administration (CNSA), told the audience on the CNSA live stream for 5B-Y3 that the re-entry process was improved with the "passivation process", and the core stage was specially designed with lighter materials so the vast majority of components will be ablated during the re-entry. Before the launch of 5B-Y4, Liu Bing, deputy director-designer of the Long March 5B, told journalists that "an elaborative evaluation" was performed on the 5B to enable safe re-entry, though no details regarding the improved re-entry procedure were revealed. 

The core stage of the Long March 5B-Y3 re-entered Earth's atmosphere on 30 July 2022 over the Indian and Pacific oceans. The debris of 5B-Y4 fell down in south-central Pacific Ocean on 4 November 2022.

Launch Statistics 
Rockets in the Long March 5 family currently have accumulated a total of 9 launches . Of these, 8 were successful with a single failed launch.

List of launches

Past launches

Planned launches

See also 

 Comparison of orbital launcher families
 Comparison of orbital launch systems
 Expendable launch system
 Lists of rockets

Notes

References

External links 
 

Long March (rocket family)
Vehicles introduced in 2016
2016 in technology
2016 in China